Lisa Ramjit (born 1 October 2004) is an American cricketer. She made her Women's Twenty20 International (WT20I) debut for the United States women's cricket team on 17 May 2019, against Canada, in the 2019 ICC Women's Qualifier Americas tournament.

In August 2019, she was named in United States' squad for the 2019 ICC Women's World Twenty20 Qualifier tournament in Scotland. She played in the United States' opening match of the tournament, on 31 August 2019, against Scotland.

In February 2021, she was named in the Women's National Training Group by the USA Cricket Women's National Selectors ahead of the 2021 Women's Cricket World Cup Qualifier and the 2021 ICC Women's T20 World Cup Americas Qualifier tournaments. In October 2021, she was named in the American team for the 2021 Women's Cricket World Cup Qualifier tournament in Zimbabwe.

Personal life
Her parents moved to the United States from Guyana, where they both played cricket. They are also of Indian descent. She grew up in Bowie, Maryland.

References

External links
 

2004 births
Living people
Sportspeople from Washington, D.C.
American women cricketers
United States women Twenty20 International cricketers
People from Bowie, Maryland
American people of Indo-Guyanese descent
American sportspeople of Guyanese descent
American sportspeople of Indian descent
21st-century American women